Barbados national football team results may refer to:
Barbados national football team results (2000–2019)
Barbados national football team results (2020–present)